Blowhole may refer to:
Blowhole (anatomy), the hole at the top of a whale's or other cetacean's head
Blowhole (geology), a hole at the inland end of a sea cave
Kiama Blowhole in Kiama, Australia
The Blow Hole, a marine passage between Minstrel and East Cracroft Islands in the Central Coast of British Columbia, Canada
Blowhole Diversion Tunnel in Victoria, Australia
A type of casting defect in metalworking

See also
:Category:Blowholes